The 1977 Austrian Open , also known as the 1977 Head Cup for sponsorship reasons, was a men's tennis tournament played on outdoor clay courts.

Background
The tournament was categorized as a two-star tournament and was part of the Colgate-Palmolive Grand Prix circuit. It took place at the Tennis Stadium Kitzbühel in Kitzbühel, Austria and was held from 11 July through 17 July 1977. Guillermo Vilas won the singles title after a final that lasted 4 hours and 45 minutes.

Finals

Singles
 Guillermo Vilas defeated  Jan Kodeš 5–7, 6–2, 4–6, 6–3, 6–2

Doubles
 Buster Mottram /  Roger Taylor defeated  Colin Dowdeswell /  Chris Kachel 7–6, 6–4

References

External links
 International Tennis federation (ITF) – Tournament details

Austrian Open
Austrian Open Kitzbühel
Austrian Open